Prothipendyl (brand names Dominal, Timovan, Tolnate), also known as azaphenothiazine or phrenotropin, is an anxiolytic, antiemetic, and antihistamine of the azaphenothiazine group which is marketed in Europe and is used to treat anxiety and agitation in psychotic syndromes. It differs from promazine only by the replacement of one carbon atom with a nitrogen atom in the tricyclic ring system. Prothipendyl is said to not possess antipsychotic effects, and in accordance, appears to be a weaker dopamine receptor antagonist than other phenothiazines.

Synthesis
See also: Pipazetate.

1-Azaphenothiazine [261-96-1] (1)
3-Dimethylaminopropyl chloride [109-54-6] (2)
Sodium hydride suspension

References

Antiemetics
Anxiolytics
H1 receptor antagonists
Hypnotics
Phenothiazines
Sedatives